The Seri Rambai is a seventeenth-century Dutch cannon displayed at Fort Cornwallis in George Town, the capital city of the Malaysian state of Penang and a UNESCO World Heritage Site. It is the largest bronze gun in Malaysia, a fertility symbol and the subject of legends and prophecy.

The cannon's history in the Malacca Straits began in the early 1600s, when Dutch East India Company officers gave it to the Sultan of Johor in return for trading concessions. In 1613, the Sultanate of Aceh attacked and destroyed Johor, captured the sultan, and took Seri Rambai to Aceh. Near the end of the eighteenth century the cannon was sent by Aceh to Selangor and mounted next to one of the town's hilltop forts. In 1871, the British colonial government launched an attack on the town in retaliation to a pirate attack, destroying the forts and confiscating the Seri Rambai.

The gun was originally displayed at George Town's Esplanade; in the 1950s it was moved to Fort Cornwallis.

Background 
Southeast Asia abounds with tales of historic cannon: many are said to be imbued with supernatural powers; some are revered for their cultural and spiritual significance; others are notable for having been present at defining moments in the region's history. Burma's Glass Palace Chronicle recounts a story about the Burmese–Siamese war (1765–1767) that illustrates the divine properties ascribed to certain cannon. After attempts to repel Burmese attacks on the Siamese capital had proved unsuccessful, the King of Siam ordered that the city's guardian spirit, a great cannon called Dwarawadi, be used to halt the advance. The gun was ceremoniously hoisted and aimed at the enemy's camp, but the powder failed to ignite. Fearing the guardian of the city had abandoned them, the king's officials implored their sovereign to surrender.

One of Jakarta's best known fertility symbols is the Si Jagur, a Portuguese cannon exhibited next to the city's History Museum. The writer Aldous Huxley in 1926 described the gun as a "prostrate God" that women caressed, sat astride and prayed to for children. Near the entrance to Thailand's Ministry of Defence building in Bangkok is a cannon known as the Phaya Tani, an enormous gun captured from the Sultanate of Pattani in 1785. The cannon is a symbol of cultural identity in Pattani and the profound sense of loss caused by its seizure is still felt today: when Bangkok refused to return the gun and in 2013 sent a replica instead, suspected insurgents bombed the replica nine days later.

The Seri Rambai 
The Seri Rambai is a Dutch cannon displayed on the ramparts of Fort Cornwallis in George Town, the capital city of Penang and a UNESCO World Heritage Site. Two articles about the cannon have been published in the Journal of the Malaysian Branch of the Royal Asiatic Society. The first was a brief summary of the gun's history in the Malacca Straits; the second a detailed study researched by Carl Alexander Gibson-Hill, a former director of Singapore's National Museum and president of the city-state's Photographic Society. Newspapers have also discussed the cannon: in 2013 the Sunday Times began a feature about Penang with the comment "Cannons don't often have names, but the Seri Rambai, on the walls of Fort Cornwallis, is something rather special".

The Seri Rambai is a 28-pounder, 127.5 inches (3.25 m) long with a calibre of 6.1 inches; (15 cm); the barrel measures 118.75 inches; (3.02 m). It was cast in 1603 and is the largest bronze gun in Malaysia. In front of the dolphin handles is a decorative band featuring three pairs of heraldic lions with long, spiralling tails. Each pair faces a vase containing flowers. Between the handles and the Dutch East India Company's seal is a Javi inscription, inlaid with silver, celebrating the gun's capture in 1613. The base ring is incised with the gunsmith's signature and date of manufacture.

History

The Santa Catarina incident 
The Dutch bid to control southeast Asia's spice trade hinged on two principal strategies: the first: the first was to directly attack Iberian assets in the region, including Portugal's stronghold at Malacca and Spanish shipping between Manila and Acapulco; the second was to forge alliances with local rulers and offer protection in exchange for trading concessions. An important alliance was consolidated in 1603 when Dutch East India Company ships joined forces with the Sultanate of Johor to capture the Santa Catarina, a Portuguese carrack transiting the Singapore Strait. The vessel's pillaged cargo was later sold in Europe for approximately 3.5 million florins, equivalent to half the Dutch East India Company's paid capital and double that of the British East India Company. Soon after this triumph, possibly in 1605, Dutch officers presented the Seri Rambai to Johor's sultan.

Sultanate of Aceh 
One of Johor's main rivals at the time was the Sultanate of Aceh, a cosmopolitan entrepòt and centre for religious and ideological learning. Aceh's rise to power began in the early 1500s: during the following decades the sultanate expanded its territories in Sumatra and sought military assistance from Suleiman the Magnificent in a quest to banish the Portuguese from Malacca. In 1613 Aceh launched an attack of Johor, destroying its capital and taking as prisoners the sultan, his family and entourage. The Seri Rambai was captured during the assault: a Javi inscription on the gun's barrel records the event and the senior Acehnese officers involved.

The Selangor incident 
There is no recorded history of the cannon between 1613 and 1795, when the Acehnese sent the Seri Rambai to Sultan Ibrahim of Selangor in return for his brother's services in a military campaign. The Selangor incident began in June 1871 when pirates commandeered a Penang junk, killing its thirty-four passengers and crew, and taking the vessel to Selangor. The British colonial government responded swiftly: a steamer and Royal Navy warship were dispatched to Selangor with instructions to arrest the pirates and recover the stolen junk. After a series of skirmishes and the arrival of support troops and artillery, the town was burned, the forts demolished and the Seri Rambai taken to Penang. The loss of the cannon was deeply felt in Selangor: a local prophecy maintains that only when the gun is returned will the town regain its former eminence.

Penang 
According to legend the Seri Rambai was not formally unloaded in Penang but cast into shallow waters off George Town and left for almost a decade. The story describes how it was eventually retrieved by a Selangor nobleman who tied a length of thread to the gun and ordered it to float ashore. Until the 1950s the cannon was exhibited at the Esplanade in the heart of George Town, adjacent to Fort Cornwallis. It was here that the gun acquired its Malay name, Seri Rambai, and reputation as a fertility symbol. The cannon was removed during the Japanese occupation in World War II, but restored to the Esplanade once hostilities had ceased. In 1953 an article in the Straits Times discussed plans to find old cannon for display at Fort Cornwallis, adding that the cannon then nearest to the fort was on the Esplanade, 200 yards away.  By 1970 the Seri Rambai was mounted on the ramparts of Fort Cornwallis, albeit missing a wheel for its carriage.

The "Floating Cannon" of Butterworth 
Near the ferry terminal in Butterworth is an old, rusted cannon that according to a local Chinese tradition was once the Seri Rambai's female partner. The story tells how it abandoned its "mate" and floated across the channel from Penang to Butterworth. A Malay tradition ascribes a different history to the Butterworth cannon, but believes the Seri Rambai is one of a pair. The possibility that the Seri Rambai might have a twin or "relative" is not without precedent. A researcher studying Jakarta's Si Jagur found a similar gun in Lisbon's Military Museum and surmised that both had been cast by Manuel Tavares Bocarro, a Portuguese founder in Macau. An oft-told story holds that Pattani's Phaya Tani had a twin, the Seri Negara. Both were captured during Siam's conquest of the sultanate and ordered to be taken to Bangkok. One version of the tale describes how the Seri Negara fell into Pattani Bay while being ferried to the ship; another claims it was lost at sea when the Siamese vessel foundered and sank.

Notes

Citations

Sources 

Books / Monographs
 
 
 
 
 
 
 
 
 
 
 
Journals / Magazines
 
 
 
 
 
 
 
 
  Alt URL
 
 
 
 
Newspapers / News Agencies
 
 
 
 
 
 
Websites
 
 

Individual cannons
Tourist attractions in George Town, Penang
History of Johor
Former properties of the Dutch East India Company